List of gas fields in Indonesia.

 Abadi gas field
 Arun gas field
 Badak gas field
 East Natuna gas field
 Peciko gas field
 Tangguh gas field
 Tunu gas field
 Vorwata gas field

See also
 Malaysia–Thailand joint development area

Notes

 
Economy of Indonesia-related lists
Lists of oil and natural gas fields